Dog Island is located in the northwestern Florida Gulf coast, just   off-shore from Carrabelle, in Franklin County, Florida. There is, by reservation, ferry transportation to Dog Island on weekends.

There are no stores, restaurants, or public restrooms on Dog Island. A hotel, the Pelican Inn, closed in 2016. The island is less than one mile wide at its widest, and just under seven miles long.  The bulk of the island is owned by the Nature Conservancy and is a wilderness preserve. Bird nesting sites on several areas of the east end and west end of the island are strictly off-limits for people and pets. There is a volunteer fire department. Electricity and trash pickup are available.

For some years in the early 21st century, there was a White Trash Bash on Dog Island on Memorial Day.

Airport

Dog Island Airport  is an un-towered, private use airport located by the Eastern bay of Dog Island. The airport opened in 1930.

Origin
The island and its two small neighbors were discovered by the French in 1536 and named Dog Island, Isle des Chiens, because, according to different legends: 1) wild dogs were found on them; 2) the island resembles a crouched dog, or 3) the early ships put their common sailors — known as dogs — on the island before docking on the mainland so they could not jump ship. Later, the two neighbors were renamed: St. Vincent, which is a Federal wildlife refuge, and St. George, which has a causeway and an airport (FA43), has developed into a seaside vacation community with shops and beach rentals.

After World War II, Jeff Lewis, a Florida businessman, saw its potential as a vacation area and paid $12,000 for the island. Native Americans used Dog Island as a fishing camp, and the 1985 hurricanes uncovered potsherds on the west end of the island.

History
Dog Island shows evidence of human presence dating back over 8,000 years. The island also has a rich maritime history. The discovery of a 9th-century canoe is a testament to prehistoric mariners on the island. During the 17th and 18th centuries, the barrier islands may have served as a haven for piracy and smuggling.

18th century
A survivor, Monsieur Pierre Viaud, chronicled the experience  in the best-selling narrative The Shipwreck and Adventures of Monsieur Pierre Viaud, published 1769 (and translated to English in 1771).

In 1799, the Royal Navy purchased HMS Fox, a 14-gun British schooner, only to see it wreck later that year between Dog and St. George Islands.

19th century
As part of the United States, economic shipping greatly increased as St. Marks, St. Joseph, and Apalachicola became major ports on the Gulf Coast. Both sail and steam ships traveled to Dog Island to exploit its resources of lumber and naval stores, such as turpentine and pitch products. In 1838, Dog Island Light was built on the western tip of the island.

During the Civil War, Dog Island was used by the Union Navy as a base for staging the blockade of Apalachicola.

On the first of August 1899, the 2nd hurricane of the season struck the area, almost destroying the town of Carrabelle, leaving just nine homes. Roughly 6 miles inland at McIntyre, only two mill boilers were left. The summer resort of Lanark Inn was said to be "blown into the Gulf". The Carrabelle, Tallahassee and Georgia Railroad was destroyed for a distance of 30 miles, and a locomotive was displaced some 100 yards off the track.

Up to fifteen ships were wrecked (some permanently destroyed), 12 loaded with lumber. Although contemporary documents sometimes have conflicting information as to the names and nationalities of these ships, they are believed to include:

American ships
, a schooner, under the command of Capt. Cottingham.
Mary E. Morse a schooner, under the command of Capt. Densmore.
, a schooner under the command of Capt. McClean.
Grace Andrews, a schooner under the command of Capt. Brown.
Warren Adams, a schooner under the command of Capt. Gibbons
Vidette, a barkentine under the command of Capt. Waldren.
Capitola, a steamship
Iola, a steamship
Albert Haley, a fishing smack.

Norwegian ships
 Ranavola, bark under the command of Capt. Edwardson.
Vale, a bark, under the command of Capt. Andersen (this shipwreck has been identified by archaeologists).
Elsbeth, a bark under the command of Capt. Pedersen.
Jafnhar, a bark under the command of Capt. Tygensen.
Hindoo, a bark under the command of Capt. Madsen.
Russian ships:
Latara, a bark under the command of Capt. Krantman
Italian ships
Corteria, a bark which was split in half

Another 40 ships under 20 tons were sunk or destroyed.

20th century
During World War II, Dog Island was part of Camp Gordon Johnston. Four separate camps comprised the complex: three for regimental combat teams, and the fourth for the headquarters and support facilities. Dog Island was used for amphibious landings and airdrops.

An archaeological research project, the Dog Island Shipwreck Survey, was initiated in 1999 by Florida State University researcher Chuck Meide to systematically search the waters off Dog Island, using acoustic and electromagnetic devices, to discover historic shipwrecks. Project archaeologists conducted excavations on the wreck of the 1899 Norwegian lumber ship Vale mentioned above, and also located a number of other submerged archaeological sites, including the ruins of the Dog Island Lighthouse, using sonar and magnetometer.

21st century
After Hurricane Michael of 2018, portions of two more shipwrecks likely from the 1899 hurricane wrecking event re-emerged from the sand.

References

External links 
Topographic map of Dog Island
Florida State Univ. Dog Island Shipwreck Survey
Meide et al. 2000 Dog Island Shipwreck Survey 1999: Report of Historical and Archaeological Investigations, FSU Program in Underwater Archaeology Research Reports No. 4 (Can be viewed or downloaded as 252 pages in pdf format on Academia.edu)]
Dog Island

Gulf Coast barrier islands of Florida
Beaches of Florida
Beaches of Franklin County, Florida
Islands of Florida
Islands of Franklin County, Florida
Populated coastal places in Florida on the Gulf of Mexico
Unincorporated communities in Florida
Unincorporated communities in Franklin County, Florida